Chimere Eyo-Ita Ikoku, was a Nigerian professor of Pure and Industrial Chemistry who served as the 8th Vice Chancellor of the University of Nigeria, Nsukka.  He was the first Vice Chancellor of UNN to serve full two term. 

The department of Pure and Industrial Chemistry held its First Professor Chimere Ikoku Memorial Lecture / Department of Pure And Industrial Chemistry Homecoming in his honour. 

Ikoku was killed in his house at Enugu, on 31 October 2002.

References 

2002 deaths
Academic staff of the University of Nigeria
People from Enugu
Nigerian murder victims
People murdered in Nigeria
2002 murders in Nigeria
Vice-Chancellors of the University of Nigeria